Randleman is a surname. Notable people with the surname include:

Kevin Randleman (1971–2016), American mixed martial arts fighter and wrestler
Ron Randleman (born 1941), American football coach
Shirley B. Randleman (born 1950), American politician